Clavijo is a municipality of the autonomous community of La Rioja (Spain).  It is located near the capital, Logroño.  , its population was of 276 inhabitants.

In 834, according to a 12th-century spurious charter and later traditional records, the legendary battle of Clavijo between Ramiro I of Asturias and Abd ar-Rahman II of Córdoba took place nearby, but the battle was a fabrication and didn't take place.

Main sights
Castle, built by the Moors in the 9th century
Monastery of San Prudencio de Monte Laturce, founded in the 6th century
Hermitage of Santiago (18th century)
Parish church (16th-17th century)

References

External links
 

Municipalities in La Rioja (Spain)